Orangeville, Indiana may refer to:

Orangeville, DeKalb County, Indiana, an unincorporated community in Concord Township
Orangeville, Orange County, Indiana, an unincorporated community in Orangeville Township

See also
 Orangeville (disambiguation)